Shining Stars may refer to:
 The Shining Stars, an English band
The Shining Stars (professional wrestling), Primo and Epico, a professional wrestling tag tem
Shining Stars: The Official Story Of Earth, Wind & Fire, a 2001 biographical film about the American band Earth, Wind & Fire
Shining Stars, a marketing program affiliated with Kid Brands

See also
Shining Star (disambiguation)